James McGowan (31 July 1939 – 6 January 2019) was a Scottish professional footballer who played in the Football League for Mansfield Town.

References

1939 births
2019 deaths
Scottish footballers
Association football defenders
English Football League players
Kirkintilloch Rob Roy F.C. players
Mansfield Town F.C. players
St Johnstone F.C. players
Margate F.C. players
Burton Albion F.C. players
Rainworth Miners Welfare F.C. players